Porovesi is a medium-sized lake in the Vuoksi main catchment area. It is located in the Iisalmi town, Northern Savonia region in Finland.

See also
List of lakes in Finland

References

Lakes of Iisalmi